Munichia or Munychia is the ancient Greek name for a steep hill ( high) in Piraeus, Greece, known today as Kastella (Καστέλλα). This is a fashionable neighborhood in Piraeus. On the top of the hill is a Greek Orthodox church named after the Prophet Elijah.  The narrow streets around the church are surrounded by picturesque houses. The Veakeio Theater, known for its summer performances is located here.

In 403 BCE, Athenian democrats defeated forces of the Thirty Tyrants at the Battle of Munychia. In Antiquity there was also a local festival to Artemis.

External links

Areas of Athens
Ancient Athens
Piraeus